The Vordere Brandjochspitze is a peak,  high, in the Nordkette in the Karwendel range and is one of its highest and most striking peaks. In its immediate vicinity to the north-northwest is its sister summit, the Hintere Brandjochspitze, which is about 40 metres higher. To the south a prominent arête runs over to the Brandjochkreuz and the Achselkopf and down to the Innsbruck quarter of Hötting. To the east, the main ridge of the Nordkette runs over to Frau Hitt.

Ascents 
The easiest ascent, the Julius Pock Way, runs from the Frau Hitt Saddle, which may be reached on various routes from  Innsbruck or Scharnitz through the Gleirschtal and Kleinkristental valleys, up to the summit on a UIAA grade I, partly protected,  route to the top.
Another popular route runs along the Brandjochsüdgrat (UIAA III-) arête.

Literature

External links 
 Tour description at almenrausch.at

Two-thousanders of Austria
Karwendel
Mountains of Tyrol (state)
Mountains of the Alps
Innsbruck